Yaoshan Weiyan (Hànyǔ Pīnyīn: Yàoshān Wéiyǎn) was a Zen Buddhist monk who lived during the Tang dynasty.

Biography
As with most monks of the Tang Dynasty, there are conflicting lines of evidence concerning Yaoshan's life. The earliest biographical information comes from Tang Shen, who wrote Yaoshan's epitaph in 834, seven years after his death. While he is traditionally regarded as a student of Shitou Xiqian, Tang Shen's inscription mentions that he stayed with Mazu Daoyi for nearly twenty years. It also mentions Shitou as his teacher, however. Some scholars consider the epitaph to be a later forgery, although many elements of it agree with other sources. A story dating to the middle of the eleventh century relates an encounter between Yaoshan and Shitou in which Yaoshan failed to awaken, but a later visit to Mazu results in his enlightenment. This is almost certainly a fanciful jibe at Shitou and praise for Mazu, however.

Nonthinking

A story involving Yaoshan is frequently referenced in the writing of Dōgen, the founder of the Sōtō school in Japan. The story is as follows:
 

According to Carl Bielefeldt, a religious studies professor at Stanford University, this passage encapsulates the essence of Dōgen's teaching on zazen. Because of this, it is referenced frequently in his works, such as in the Shōbōgenzō, Eihei Kōroku, and most prominently his early work the Fukan zazengi. 

In another passage;

The epitaph records his teaching as thus: 
 

This teaching emphasizes the pure mind of self nature, which had been a general concept since the early Chan.

References 

Chan Buddhist monks
745 births
828 deaths
Tang dynasty Buddhist monks